

Draw

Final

Group stage

References

External links
 Women's Legends Doubles

Women's Legends Doubles